The nuckelavee or nuckalavee is a horse-like demon from Orcadian folklore that combines equine and human elements. British folklorist Katharine Briggs called it "the nastiest" of all the demons of Scotland's Northern Isles. The nuckelavee's breath was thought to wilt crops and sicken livestock, and the creature was held responsible for droughts and epidemics on land despite being predominantly a sea-dweller.

A graphic description of the nuckelavee as it appears on land was given by an islander who claimed to have had a confrontation with it, but accounts describing the details of the creature's appearance are inconsistent. In common with many other sea-monsters, it is unable to tolerate fresh water, therefore, those it is pursuing have only to cross a river or stream to be rid of it. The nuckelavee is kept in confinement during the summer months by the Mither o' the Sea, an ancient Orcadian spirit, and the only one able to control it.

Orcadian folklore had a strong Scandinavian influence, and it may be that the nuckelavee is a composite of a water horse from Celtic mythology and a creature imported by the Norsemen. As with similar malevolent entities such as the kelpie, it possibly offered an explanation for incidents that islanders in ancient times could not otherwise understand.

Etymology 
The late 19th century saw an upsurge of interest in transcribing folklore, but the recorders used inconsistent spelling and frequently anglicised words, thus the same entity could be given different names. The term nuckelavee derives from Orcadian knoggelvi, and according to Orkney resident and 19th-century folklorist Walter Traill Dennison means "Devil of the Sea". The same demon is called a mukkelevi in Shetland, where it was considered a nasty sea-trow or sea-devil.

Samuel Hibbert, an antiquarian of the early nineteenth century, considered the component nuck of the nuckelavee's name to be cognate with both the Nick in Old Nick, a name sometimes given to the Devil of Christian belief, and with the Latin necare, to kill.

Folk beliefs

Description and common attributes 
Stories of mythical Orcadian demons are recorded in the 16th-century Latin manuscripts of Jo Ben, who may have been referring to the nuckelavee in his description of the Orkney island of Stronsay. Dennison transcribed much of the information available about traditional tales told on Orkney, but to an extent romanticised and systematically altered certain elements of the stories in the process of transforming them into prose.

The nuckelavee is a mythical sea-creature that appears as a horse-like demon when it ventures onto land. Writer and folklorist Ernest Marwick considered it very similar to the Norwegian nøkk, the nuggle of Shetland and the kelpie. A unique and solitary creature possessing extensive evil powers, its malevolent behaviour can influence events throughout the islands. Islanders were terrified of the creature and would not speak its name without immediately saying a prayer. It was often found in the vicinity of a beach, but would never come ashore if it was raining.

No tales describe what form the nuckelavee takes when in the sea, but its appearance on land has been recounted in graphic detail. An islander, Tammas, claimed to have survived a confrontation with the beast and, after much cajoling from Dennison, reluctantly gave his description of the monster, the only known first-hand account. According to Tammas, the nuckelavee has a man's torso attached to a horse's back as if it were a rider. The male torso has no legs, but its arms can reach the ground from its position on top of the equine body, the legs of which have fin like appendages. The monster described by Tammas has two heads; the equine head has an enormous gaping mouth that exudes a pungent, toxic vapour, and a single giant eye like a burning red flame. A particularly gruesome detail is that the nuckelavee has no skin; black blood courses through yellow veins, and the pale sinews and powerful muscles are visible as a pulsating mass. Other reports state that the creature resembles a centaur; narratives are inconsistent in the finer details of the demon's description however. Traill Dennison only describes a man's head with a "mouth projected like that of a pig". Marwick also only mentions one head with a single red eye, and he borrows some of Tammas's characterisation by recording the creature's mouth as "like a whale's".

The nuckelavee's breath was thought to wilt crops and sicken livestock, and it was considered responsible for epidemics and drought. Seaweed burning to create what was known at the time as kelp began on Stronsay in 1722. The product – soda ash – was an alkali mainly used to treat acidic soil, although as time went on its commercial importance in soap and glass manufacture increased. The pungent smoke emitted during the process was believed to enrage the nuckelavee, resulting in a wild rampage of plague, the deaths of cattle and the destruction of crops. The nuckelavee was said to have infected horses on Stronsay with the deadly disease known as mortasheen, to demonstrate its fury and exact its revenge against the islanders for burning seaweed; the infection subsequently spread to all the other islands involved in the industry. The creature was also blamed for prolonged periods of abnormally low rainfall, leading to water shortages and poor harvests.

Confinement 
The nuckelavee is the most malevolent of the demons in and around the Scottish islands, without any redeeming characteristics. The only entity able to control it is the Mither o' the Sea, an ancient spirit in Orcadian mythology who keeps the nuckelavee confined during the summer months. In common with other mythical sea-monsters, with the possible exception of kelpies and the nuggle of Shetland, it is unable to wade through fresh flowing water, therefore it can be escaped by crossing a stream. Tammas managed to escape from the nuckelavee after he inadvertently splashed it with water from the loch he was alongside; this briefly distracted the monster, allowing Tammas to run over to a nearby channel of fresh water and jump to safety on the opposite bank.

Origins 
Malevolent creatures possibly served to provide explanations for incidents that islanders were otherwise unable to account for; many ancient myths were based upon the natural elements of the turbulent and ever changing sea around Orkney. Established Orcadian tales were strongly influenced by Scandinavian mythology with a blending of traditional Celtic stories, so the nuckelavee may have its roots in a mythical creature imported by the Norsemen fused with a traditional Celtic water horse.

See also 
 List of fictional horses
 Water horse
 Hippocampus (mythology)
 Kappa (folklore)
 Neck (water spirit)
 Peg Powler
 Selkie
 Vodyanoi

References

Notes

Citations

Bibliography 

Horses in mythology
Mythological hybrids
Mythological monsters
Orcadian culture
Orkney
Scottish folklore
Scottish legendary creatures